The Men's mass start race of the 2015 World Single Distance Speed Skating Championships was held on 15 February 2015.

Results
The race was started at 16:04.

References

Men's mass start